The 2001 Copa América was held in Colombia, from 11 to 29 July. It was organised by CONMEBOL, South America's football governing body. Colombia won the tournament for the 1st time without conceding a goal.

Brazil were the defending champions who were knocked out from the tournament by Honduras after suffering a 0–2 defeat in the quarter-final.

There is no qualifying for the final tournament. CONMEBOL's ten South American countries participate, along with two more invited countries, making a total of twelve teams competing in the tournament. Originally, Mexico and CONCACAF Champions Canada were invited.

Prior to the tournament, three meetings were held by CONMEBOL authorities who were concerned about potential security issues in Colombia. On 1 July they announced the cancellation of the tournament. Venezuela offered to host the competition, but on 6 July CONMEBOL decided to reinstate the plans for Colombia, and the tournament was held on schedule.

When the tournament was originally cancelled, Canada disbanded its training camp and Canadian players returned to their club teams. The Canadian Soccer Association announced they would not be able to participate in the reinstated tournament. With only a few days' notice, Costa Rica (CONCACAF) accepted an invite to take Canada's spot in the tournament. The Costa Ricans advanced to the knockout stage, losing in the quarterfinals.

Complaining about the sudden reversal, and claiming that Argentine players had received death threats from terrorist groups, the Argentine Football Association decided to withdraw from the competition on 10 July, in spite of Colombian authorities proposing to implement additional protection measures. With the tournament starting the next day, Honduras (CONCACAF) were invited, arriving with barely enough players on 13 July in an airplane provided by the Colombian Air Force, after the tournament started and just a few hours before its first game. The Hondurans performed well through the tournament, finishing in third place.

Despite the pre-tournament concerns, there were no incidents of violence nor acts of assault towards any of the participating nations.

Venues

Squads
For a complete list of participating squads: 2001 Copa América squads

Draw
The draw for the competition took place on 10 January 2001 at the Corferias convention center in Bogotá. The teams were divided into three groups of four teams each.

Shortly before the start of the tournament, two teams drawn into group C (Argentina and Canada) withdrew and were replaced by other invited teams (Costa Rica and Honduras). This didn't affect composition of other groups.

Group stage
Each team plays one match against each of the other teams within the same group. Three points are awarded for a win, one point for a draw and zero points for a defeat.

First and second placed teams, in each group, advance to the quarter-finals.
The best third placed team and the second best third placed team, also advance to the quarter-finals.

Tie-breaking criteria
Teams were ranked on the following criteria:
1. Greater number of points in all group matches
2. Goal difference in all group matches
3. Greater number of goals scored in all group matches
4. Head-to-head results
5. Drawing of lots by the CONMEBOL Organising Committee

 All times local (UTC-5)

Group A

Group B

Group C

Ranking of third-placed teams
At the end of the first stage, a comparison was made between the third-placed teams of each group. The two best third-placed teams advanced to the quarter-finals.

Knockout stage

Quarter-finals

Semi-finals

Third-place match

Final

Result

Goalscorers
With six goals, Víctor Aristizábal is the top scorer in the tournament. In total, 60 goals were scored by 41 different players, with none of them credited as own goal.

6 goals
  Víctor Aristizábal

5 goals
  Paulo Wanchope

3 goals
  Cristián Montecinos
  Amado Guevara

2 goals

  Denílson
  Agustín Delgado
  Saúl Martínez
  Jared Borgetti
  Virgilio Ferreira

1 goal

  Alex
  Juliano Belletti
  Guilherme
  Marcelo Corrales
  Reinaldo Navia
  Eudalio Arriaga
  Gerardo Bedoya
  Freddy Grisales
  Giovanni Hernández
  Iván Córdoba
  Steven Bryce
  Rolando Fonseca
  Cléber Chalá
  Ángel Fernández
  Édison Méndez
  Júnior Izaguirre
  Jesús Arellano
  Alberto García Aspe
  Daniel Osorno
  Guido Alvarenga
  Silvio Garay
  José del Solar
  Roberto Holsen
  Abel Lobatón
  Juan Pajuelo
  Joe Bizera
  Javier Chevantón
  Carlos Morales
  Rodrigo Lemos
  Pablo Lima
  Andrés Martínez
  Richard Morales

Final positions

Marketing

Sponsorship
Global platinum sponsor:
 Telefónica
 Mastercard-Maestro
 Corona
Global gold sponsor:
 Coca-Cola
 Banamex
Local supplier
 Traffic Group

References

External links
 Copa América 2001 at RSSSF

 
2001
2001 in Colombian football
2001 in South American football
2001
2001–02 in Honduran football
2001–02 in Costa Rican football
July 2001 sports events in South America
Sport in Cali
Sports competitions in Bogotá
21st century in Bogotá
Sport in Barranquilla
Sport in Medellín
Manizales
Pereira, Colombia
Armenia, Colombia
21st century in Barranquilla